Jack Hawkes defeated Jim Willard 6–1, 6–3, 6–1 in the final to win the men's singles tennis title at the 1926 Australasian Championships.

Seeds
The seeded players are listed below. John Hawkes is the champion; others show the round in which they were eliminated.

 James Anderson (semifinals)
 Gerald Patterson (first round)
 Bob Schlesinger (semifinals)
 Jack Hawkes (champion)
 Pat O'Hara Wood (quarterfinals)
 Norman Peach (quarterfinals)
 Gar Hone (quarterfinals)
 Jim Willard (finalist)

Draw

Key
 Q = Qualifier
 WC = Wild card
 LL = Lucky loser
 r = Retired

Finals

Earlier rounds

Section 1

Section 2

Section 3

Section 4

External links
 

Australian Championships - Men's Singles
Singles